Pia Hierzegger (born 2 February 1972) is an Austrian actress. She has appeared in more than fifteen films since 2004.

Selected filmography

References

External links 

1972 births
Living people
Austrian film actresses